Christine Hunt (15 June 1950 – 25 September 2020) was an Australian athlete. She competed in the women's javelin throw at the 1976 Summer Olympics.

References

1950 births
2020 deaths
Athletes (track and field) at the 1976 Summer Olympics
Australian female javelin throwers
Olympic athletes of Australia
Place of birth missing